Lord Robert Seymour (20 January 1748 – 23 November 1831) was a British politician who sat in the Irish House of Commons from 1771 to 1776 and in the British House of Commons from 1771 to 1807. He was known as Hon. Robert Seymour-Conway until 1793, when his father was created a marquess; he then became Lord Robert Seymour-Conway, but dropped the surname of Conway after his father's death in 1794.

Biography

Seymour was the third son of Francis Seymour-Conway, 1st Marquess of Hertford. Educated at Eton, he was commissioned an ensign in the 40th Regiment of Foot in 1766, and became a lieutenant in the 2nd Regiment of Irish Horse the same year. In 1770, he became a captain in the 8th Dragoons.

Seymour-Conway was returned for two Parliamentary seats in 1771: Lisburn, in the Parliament of Ireland, and the family borough of Orford in the British House of Commons. In 1773, he became a major in the 3rd Irish Horse.

By his first marriage, on 15 June 1773 to Anne Delmé, daughter of MP Peter Delmé, Seymour-Conway had five children:
Elizabeth Seymour (1775 – 23 February 1848), married first William Griffith Davies (1762–1814), on 10 December 1805, married second Herbert Evans (d. 1843) on 2 May 1817
Henry Seymour (c.1776 – 13 February 1843), married Hon. Emily Byng (d. 1824), daughter of George Byng, 4th Viscount Torrington, on 1 July 1800
Frances Isabella Seymour (d. 3 June 1838), married George FitzRoy, 2nd Baron Southampton
Anna Maria Seymour (22 September 1781 – ?)
Gertrude Hussey Carpenter Seymour (28 July 1784 – 3 January 1825), married John Hensleigh Allen on 12 November 1812

Seymour-Conway transferred into the 1st Foot Guards as a Captain-Lieutenant on 7 November 1775, and became captain of a company in the regiment on 30 January 1776. 

He gave up his seat at Lisburn that year, but continued to sit for Orford. He served as an aide-de-camp to Sir Henry Clinton in America from 1780 to 1781, but resigned his commission in 1782.

In Parliament, Seymour-Conway followed the rest of his family in supporting the North Ministry and the Fox-North Coalition, and opposing the ministry of Shelburne. In 1784, he turned over the Orford seat to his younger brother, George, having purchased a seat at Wootton Bassett from Henry St John, who managed it. In 1787, he bought the estate of Taliaris in Llandeilo, Carmarthenshire, which would become his principal seat. He left his Commons seat in 1790, the year that he and his brother Henry were granted, for life, the sinecures of joint prothonotary, clerk of the crown, filazer, and keeper of the declarations of the King's Bench in Ireland. By 1816, these offices brought an income of more than £10,000 a year.

He returned to Parliament for Orford in 1794, and continued to hold the seat until 1807. He took some interest in agriculture, as in 1796, he invented a new one-horse cart. On 2 December 1803, he was appointed Lieutenant-Colonel Commandant of the 2nd Battalion, Carmarthenshire Volunteers. He resigned that command on 6 January 1808.

After the death of his wife Anne, Seymour made a second marriage, on 2 May 1806, to Hon. Anderlechtia Clarissa Chetwynd (d. 1855), daughter of William Chetwynd, 4th Viscount Chetwynd, but they had no children.

During the 1807 election, Seymour was returned both for Orford and Carmarthenshire, choosing to sit for the latter, which he represented until 1820. 

On 1 July 1807, Seymour, who owned a house in Portland Place, was sworn a Justice of the Peace for Middlesex. He took an active role in civic affairs in London, and was for some time Director of the Poor for his parish of St Marylebone. This included a particular interest in the care and treatment of the insane, culminating in his appointment in 1827 to the commission superintending the building of Hanwell Asylum and as a Metropolitan Commissioner in Lunacy in 1828. However, he was now approaching the end of his life and played little active role as a Lunatic Commissioner. 

In 1829, Seymour funded the building of the north transept and a vicarage for Taliaris Chapel.

References

Links
 Extracts from Lord Robert's diary for 1788

1748 births
1831 deaths
5th Dragoon Guards officers
8th King's Royal Irish Hussars officers
Seymour Conway, Robert
Seymour Conway, Robert
Seymour Conway, Robert
Seymour Conway, Robert
British MPs 1796–1800
Carabiniers (6th Dragoon Guards) officers
Grenadier Guards officers
Robert Seymour
Seymour Conway, Robert
Members of the Parliament of the United Kingdom for English constituencies
Members of the Parliament of the United Kingdom for Carmarthenshire constituencies
People educated at Eton College
South Lancashire Regiment officers
Tory MPs (pre-1834)
UK MPs 1801–1802
UK MPs 1802–1806
UK MPs 1806–1807
UK MPs 1807–1812
UK MPs 1812–1818
UK MPs 1818–1820
Younger sons of marquesses
Members of the Parliament of Ireland (pre-1801) for County Antrim constituencies
Prothonotaries